The BL postcode area, also known as the Bolton postcode area, is a group of ten postcode districts in North West England. These cover most of the Metropolitan Borough of Bolton and the northern and central parts of the Metropolitan Borough of Bury in Greater Manchester, plus small parts of the boroughs of Chorley, Rossendale and Blackburn with Darwen in Lancashire.



Coverage
The approximate coverage of the postcode districts:

|-
! BL0
| BURY
| Ramsbottom, Edenfield, Shuttleworth
| Bury, Rossendale
|-
! BL1
| BOLTON
| Bolton centre, Smithills, Halliwell, Heaton
| Bolton
|-
! BL2
| BOLTON
| Bolton centre, Ainsworth, Bradley Fold, Bradshaw, Breightmet, Harwood, Tonge Fold, Tonge Moor
| Bolton, Bury
|-
! BL3
| BOLTON
| Bolton centre, Little Lever, Great Lever, Darcy Lever, Deane
| Bolton
|-
! BL4
| BOLTON
| Farnworth, Kearsley
| Bolton
|-
! BL5
| BOLTON
| Over Hulton, Westhoughton
| Bolton
|-
! BL6
| BOLTON
| Blackrod, Horwich, Lostock, Rivington
| Bolton, Chorley
|-
! BL7
| BOLTON
| Belmont, Bromley Cross, Chapeltown, Edgworth, Egerton, Turton
| Blackburn with Darwen, Bolton
|-
! BL8
| BURY
| Bury centre, Brandlesholme, Greenmount, Affetside, Hawkshaw, Holcombe, Ramsbottom, Tottington, Walshaw
| Bury
|-
! BL9
| BURY
| Bury centre, Heap, Heap Bridge, Nangreaves, Summerseat, Unsworth, Walmersley, Bircle, Jericho
| Bury
|}

Map

See also
List of postcode areas in the United Kingdom
Postcode Address File

References

External links
Royal Mail's Postcode Address File
hA quick introduction to Royal Mail's Postcode Address File (PAF)

Metropolitan Borough of Bolton
Metropolitan Borough of Bury
Postcode areas covering North West England